The 1969 Asian Rugby Championship was the 1st edition of the tournament, and it was played in Tokyo, Japan. Five teams participated and Japan won the tournament. Some of the matches were postponed due to heavy snow and the match between South Korea and Thailand was cancelled.

Tournament 
Ten games were scheduled but only nine were played. As reported in the Japanese-language journal Rugby Football – using the scoring method of the time where a try (T) was worth 3 points; a goal (G) was worth 5 points, try included; and a penalty goal (PG) was worth 3 points – the match results were:

, sources in English for this tournament tend to be incomplete. Korean-language sources reported on the tournament at the time but recorded some results incorrectly: Schedule, March 8 (result for Japan vs Thailand is incorrect), March 9, March 11, March 14 (result for Taiwan vs Thailand is incorrect), March 16, March 17.

Standings

References

1969
1969 rugby union tournaments for national teams
International rugby union competitions hosted by Japan
1969 in Japanese sport
Asian Rugby
1969 in rugby union